Mansion is a building situated in Záturčie, Slovakia.

History 

An evangelical church was founded by Frantisek the V. Revay in the village named Horne Zaturcie in 1640. In 1872, the church was closed due to anti-reformation under the Hungarian monarchy. In 1894, Frantisek the IX of Revay ordered the reconstruction of the building to a mansion. After Frantisek's death, Jan Reichl, a man who served him since he was 14, inherited the mansion. However, in 1921 the building was commissioned to be a school and the first started in the yard of the mansion; this however was later transformed into a state-owned farm. The estate was returned to the Reichel's in 1989, who rebuilt it into a hotel and a restaurant.

Houses in Slovakia
Martin, Slovakia
Buildings and structures in Žilina Region